is a railway station on the San'yō Shinkansen and San'yō Main Line, operated by West Japan Railway Company (JR West) in Shimonoseki, Yamaguchi, Japan.

Lines
Shin-Shimonoseki Station is served by the following JR West lines:
Sanyo Shinkansen
Sanyo Main Line

Structure
The Sanyo Shinkansen has one island platform, one side platform with a prepared track layer and two through tracks without platforms. All of them are elevated. The Sanyo Main Line has two side platforms and one siding track without platform. All of them are on ground. Two lines cross spatially.

Track 5 has no platform.

History

This station was originally named Ichinomiya (一ノ宮). It was located near the Sumiyoshi shrine (住吉神社) which is also called Nagato Ichinomiya (長門一宮).
 1 December 1906: Sanyo Railway was nationalized.
 1 January 1916: The station was renamed to Nagato-Ichinomiya (長門一ノ宮).
 10 March 1975: The Sanyo Shinkansen was opened and the station was renamed to Shin-Shimonoseki.
 1 April 1987: Privatization of JNR.

Adjacent stations

Some Hikari and Sakura Shinkansen trains pass this station.

Main sightseeing spots and institutions
Sumiyoshi shrine (National treasure)

Transportation

Bus
Bus company (A loop-line bus in the city.)
 Sanden Kohtsu Co.,Ltd.

See also
Shimonoseki Station

External links
Shin-Shimonoseki Station

Railway stations in Yamaguchi Prefecture
Railway stations in Japan opened in 1901